Kim Boo-kyum (born 21 January 1958) is a South Korean activist and politician, who has served as the Prime Minister of South Korea from 2021 to 2022. He was the former Minister of Interior and Safety from 2017 to 2019. A member of the Democratic Party, he also served as the Member of the National Assembly for Suseong 1st constituency from 2016 to 2020 and was previously MP for Gunpo from 2000 to 2012, first for the Grand National Party (GNP) and then, from 2003, the liberal Uri Party and its successors. In the 2016 parliamentary election in Daegu, Kim defeated his Saenuri opponent Kim Moon-soo in a 62.5 percent landslide, marking the first time a member of a liberal party had been elected in that city since 1985. Kim had earlier stood for mayor of Daegu in the 2014 local elections, and received 40 percent of the vote, a number seen at the time as unusually large in the conservative stronghold. He stated in 2014 that he hoped to "overcome the barrier of regionalism".

Early life and education 
Kim Boo-kyum was born on 21 January 1958 in Sangju, North Gyeongsang. He is the eldest of the one son and three daughters of Kim Young-ryong and Cha Sook-hui. His father, Kim Young-ryong, was just 19 years old when Kim Boo-kyum was born.

Kim was admitted to study political science at Seoul National University in 1976, but was expelled for taking part in protests against the Yushin Constitution in 1977, before being readmitted and expelled again for violating martial law in 1980. He was later reinstated a second time, and received his degree in 1987.

Political career

Early political career 
Kim joined politics as one of the founders of the centre-left Hankyoreh Democratic Party (HDP) in 1988. He ran as the HDP candidate for Dongjak 1st constituency in the 1988 election but lost. No candidates were elected, except Park Hyung-oh that contested for Shinan, who immediately joined the Peace Democratic Party (PDP) due to the pre-agreement. The HDP was later de-registered.

Following the de-registration of the HDP, Kim joined the Democratic Party that was established by Kim Dae-jung in 1991. He had an intention to run in the 1992 election, but could not become a candidate. He served as the Deputy Spokesperson of the party, however, was arrested on 18 November after it was revealed that Kim received 5,000,000 won (≒ ￡3,240) from a North Korean spy named Lee Seon-shil during the 1988 election. According to Park Jie-won, the then Senior Deputy Spokesperson, Kim borrowed the money from Lee through his mother-in-law, but paid it back after the election. He also indicated that Kim was not related to his party in 1988; he was also told that Kim did not even know that Lee was a spy.

Prime Minister (2021-2022)

Nomination 
As the former Prime Minister Chung Sye-kyun had the intention to run for the 2022 presidential election, he was supposed to resign, but initially, he was still considering when he would resign. Several newspapers reported that he would step down after the by-elections on 7 April 2021. Despite the knowledge that President Moon Jae-in was reported to prefer a female prime minister, Kim was considered one of the potential candidates for the position.

On 15 April, Chung officially submitted his resignation to Moon Jae-in, and it was accepted the next day. The same day, Kim was nominated the new Prime Minister, succeeding Chung. As he is categorised as a "minority" of the Democratic Party, his nomination was regarded as a step to renovate the party that faced a serious defeat in the 2021 by-elections.

On 13 May, 168 out of 176 MPs voted in favour of the appointment of Kim as the Prime Minister. The next day, he was sworn in as Prime Minister at the Central Government Complex in Seoul.

Political positions 
Kim is considered a centrist. As a member of the Grand National Party he pressed for reform in the party, and when he defected from the party in 2003 he cited the need "to unify the nation ... and to root out regionalism". A 2008 U.S. diplomatic cable released by WikiLeaks described Kim as a "reasonable progressive lawmaker" representing a "centrist platform", and as a member of the Supreme Council of the Democratic United Party in 2012 he defended centrist members of the party from deselection. Commentators have named Kim a potential candidate in the 2017 presidential elections.

Personal life 
Kim's daughter, Yoon Se-in (born Kim Ji-su), is a television actress. Yoon campaigned for Kim in the 2012 parliamentary election and the 2014 mayoral race, but was unable to in 2016.

Election results

General elections

Local elections

Mayor of Daegu

References

External links 

|-

|-

|-

1958 births
Living people
Gimhae Kim clan
Members of the National Assembly (South Korea)
Minjoo Party of Korea politicians
People from Sangju
Liberty Korea Party politicians
Prime Ministers of South Korea
Interior ministers of South Korea
Seoul National University alumni
United New Democratic Party politicians
Uri Party politicians
Yonsei University alumni